Culex erraticus translates in English to Erratic Mosquito is a species of mosquito in the family Culicidae.

References

erraticus
Articles created by Qbugbot
Insects described in 1906